téléGrenoble Isère is a private local TV channel of Grenoble's agglomeration in France. It broadcast in digital television and it is also received in a large part of Isère (Voiron and in Oisans for the ski resorts as Alpe d'Huez and Les Deux Alpes).

téléGrenoble Isère began broadcasting on 20 October 2005. It is headquartered rue Eugène-Faure in Grenoble.

In 2016, The Superior Council of Audiovisual authorizes the channel to broadcast in high definition.

Organisation 
President : Gérard Balthazard.

Presenters : Thibault Leduc, Marie-Caroline Abrial, Lucile Dailly, Laury Baillet, Olivier Escalon, Fanny Chatchate and Mélanie Tournadre.

References

External links 
Official website

Television stations in France
Television channels and stations established in 2005
Mass media in Grenoble